"Saw Lightning" is a song by the American musician Beck. It was released in 2019 as the first single from his fourteenth studio album Hyperspace. It was co-written by Beck and Pharrell Williams. Aside from vocals, Williams also plays drums and keyboards in the song.

Background

Beck said: "I was making a record called Midnite Vultures and while we were making it… I remember the Neptunes [Pharrell's production duo] had just come out, and I said I'm gonna do the next record with the Neptunes, and here we are 20 years later".

Reception

Daniel Kreps of Rolling Stone wrote that the song "melds the jangly acoustic guitar of Beck's folksier work with the dancefloor-ready programmed beats prominent in his 2017 LP Colors".

UDiscoverMusic wrote of the song: "A classic slice of cross-genre boundary-breaking, 'Saw Lightning' sees Beck taking an about-turn from the euphoric pop of Colors to assemble a junkyard-blues-hip-hop confection featuring rapped vocals" and "some One Foot in the Grave- style blues harmonica".

Charts

Weekly charts

Year-end charts

References

2019 songs
2019 singles
Beck songs
Songs written by Beck
Songs written by Pharrell Williams
Capitol Records singles